The Beijing Mall is a shopping mall at Wangfujing in Beijing, China, using the Phase II building of Beijing Hotel at 301 Wangfujing Street. It is developed by the New Yansha Group, a subsidiary of Beijing Tourism Group, and opened in July 2004.

The mall was closed in 2020 due to deficit.

See also

Golden Resources Mall, a different mall in Beijing by the same developer

References

External links
 

2020 disestablishments in China
Defunct shopping malls
Dongcheng District, Beijing
Shopping malls in Beijing